The Last Days of Pompeii is an 1834 novel by Edward Bulwer-Lytton.

The Last Days of Pompeii may also refer to:

Films
The Last Days of Pompeii (1908 film), an Italian film by Arturo Ambrosio
The Last Days of Pompeii (1913 film), an Italian silent film by Caserini and Rodolfi
Jone or the Last Days of Pompeii, a 1913 Italian silent film by Del Colle and Vidali
The Last Days of Pompeii (1926 film), an Italian silent film by Carmine Gallone and Amleto Palermi
The Last Days of Pompeii (1935 film), a film starring Preston Foster, David Holt, and Basil Rathbone
The Last Days of Pompeii (1950 film), a French-Italian film by Marcel L'Herbier and Paolo Moffa
The Last Days of Pompeii (1959 film), an Italian film by Sergio Leone, credited to Mario Bonnard
The Last Days of Pompeii (miniseries), a 1984 U.S. miniseries

Other uses
L'ultimo giorno di Pompei (The Last Day of Pompeii), an 1825 opera by Giovanni Pacini
The Last Day of Pompeii, an 1833 painting by Karl Briullov
The Last Days of Pompeii (album), a 1991 album by Nova Mob

See also
Herculaneum
Mount Vesuvius
Pliny the Elder
Pliny the Younger
Pompeii
Pompeii: The Last Day, a 2003 docudrama